The Winner's Curse is a 2014 fantasy novel written by Marie Rutkoski.  The New York Times stated, “The Winner’s Curse” is initially filled with society parties, elaborate hairstyles and low-cut gowns. Almost every chapter ends on a dramatic note.  The Guardian reviewed the book as The Winner's Curse is a one of a kind, BRILLIANT book, perfect for fans of the entire Dystopian Genre! Everything about the book was so well planned out, the setting, the politics, the characters that it sucked me right in and refused to let go.

References

2014 American novels
American fantasy novels
Dystopian novels
Farrar, Straus and Giroux books